Choi Mu-bae (최무배, born June 27, 1970 in Busan), often anglicised  to Mu-bae Choi, is a South Korean former Heavyweight Greco-Roman wrestler and professional mixed martial artist. A professional since 2004, he has competed for World Victory Road, the PRIDE Fighting Championships, K-1 Hero's, and Pancrase. He holds notable victories over UFC veterans Soa Palelei and Dave Herman.

Mixed martial arts
Choi made his mixed martial arts debut in 2004 at Pride FC when he defeated Yusuke Imamura, who was also a former wrestler.

He has a professional MMA record of 11-4 as of May 2, 2015. Choi was scheduled to fight in K-1 Dynamite!! USA in Los Angeles against "Mighty" Mo Siliga on June 2, 2007.  Choi however pulled out of the event for undisclosed reasons.

Choi debuted in Sengoku at the Sengoku 3 event on June 8, 2008, losing against the Brazilian fighter Marcio Cruz.

As for his Japanese-language nickname Fuchin-kan, Fuchin means "unsinkable", and Kan simultaneously means "warship" and "[South] Korea".

Personal life
He was born in Busan, South Korea, on June 27, 1970.

Mixed martial arts record

|-
| Loss
| align=center| 13–8
| Kazuyuki Fujita
| TKO (punches)
| Road FC 050 
| 
| align=center| 1
| align=center| 1:55
| Daejeon, South Korea
|Openweight bout.
|-
| Win
| align=center| 13–7
| Anding Ma
| TKO (punches)
| Road FC 049 
| 
| align=center| 1
| align=center| 4:09
| Seoul, South Korea
| 
|-
| Loss
| align=center| 12-7
| Jake Heun
| Decision (unanimous)
| Road FC 27
|  
| align=center| 3
| align=center| 5:00
| Wonju, Gangwon Province, South Korea
| 
|-
| Loss
| align=center| 12-6
| Mighty Mo
| TKO (punches)
| Road FC 27
|  
| align=center| 1
| align=center| 3:46
| Shanghai, China
|ROAD FC Openweight Tournament Quarterfinals.
|-
| Loss
| align=center| 12-5
| Mighty Mo
| KO (punch)
| Road FC 26
|  
| align=center| 1
| align=center| 0:37
| Seoul, South Korea
| 
|-
| Win 
| align=center| 12-4
| Yusuke Kawaguchi
| TKO (punches)
| Road FC 24
|  
| align=center| 2
| align=center| 4:50
| Tokyo, Japan
| 
|-
| Win 
| align=center| 11-4
| Lucas Tani 
| TKO (punches)  
| Road FC 23 
|  
| align=center| 1
| align=center| 1:45
| Seoul, South Korea
| 
|-
| Win 
| align=center| 10-4
| Toyohiko Monma
| KO (punch)
| Revolution 1: The Return of Legend
|  
| align=center| 1
| align=center| 0:26
| Seoul, South Korea
|Openweight bout.
|-
| Loss
| align=center| 9-4
| Yoshihiro Nakao
| Decision (unanimous)
| World Victory Road Presents: Sengoku 9
| 
| align=center| 3
| align=center| 5:00
| Saitama, Japan
| 
|-
| Win
| align=center| 9-3
| Katsuhisa Fujii
| Decision (unanimous)
| Pancrase: Changing Tour 3
| 
| align=center| 2
| align=center| 5:00
| Tokyo, Japan
| 
|-
| Win
| align=center| 8-3
| Dave Herman
| TKO (punches)
| World Victory Road Presents: Sengoku no Ran 2009
| 
| align=center| 2
| align=center| 2:22
| Saitama, Japan
| 
|-
| Loss
| align=center| 7-3
| Márcio Cruz
| Submission (triangle armbar)
| World Victory Road Presents: Sengoku 3
| 
| align=center| 1
| align=center| 4:37
| Saitama, Japan
| 
|-
| Win
| align=center| 7-2
| Gary Goodridge
| KO (punch)
| The Khan 1
| 
| align=center| 2
| align=center| N/A
| Seoul, South Korea
| 
|-
| Win
| align=center| 6-2
| Masayuki Kono
| Technical Submission (arm-triangle choke)
| Pancrase: Blow 10
| 
| align=center| 2
| align=center| 1:36
| Tokyo, Japan
| 
|-
| Loss
| align=center| 5-2
| Sylvester Terkay
| Decision (unanimous)
| Hero's 2005 in Seoul
| 
| align=center| 2
| align=center| 5:00
| Seoul, South Korea
|Openweight bout.
|-
| Loss
| align=center| 5-1
| Sergei Kharitonov
| KO (punches)
| PRIDE 29
| 
| align=center| 1
| align=center| 3:24
| Saitama, Japan
| 
|-
| Win
| align=center| 5-0
| Giant Silva
| Submission (arm-triangle choke)
| PRIDE Shockwave 2004
| 
| align=center| 1
| align=center| 5:47
| Saitama, Japan
|Super Heavyweight bout; Mu-bae weighed in at 112.9 kg.
|-
| Win
| align=center| 4-0
| Soa Palelei
| Submission (rear-naked choke)
| PRIDE 28
| 
| align=center| 2
| align=center| 4:55
| Saitama, Japan
| 
|-
| Win
| align=center| 3-0
| Murad Ammaev
| KO (suplex and punches)
| Gladiator FC: Day 2
| 
| align=center| 1
| align=center| 0:18
| Seoul, South Korea
| 
|-
| Win
| align=center| 2-0
| Yoshihisa Yamamoto
| Decision (unanimous)
| PRIDE Bushido 3
| 
| align=center| 2
| align=center| 5:00
| Yokohama, Japan
| 
|-
| Win
| align=center| 1-0
| Yusuke Imamura
| Submission (rear-naked choke)
| PRIDE Bushido 2
| 
| align=center| 1
| align=center| 4:08
| Yokohama, Japan
|

References

External links
 
PRIDE profile
Team Tackle Website

Heavyweight mixed martial artists
Living people
Sportspeople from Busan
South Korean male mixed martial artists
Mixed martial artists utilizing Greco-Roman wrestling
South Korean male sport wrestlers
1970 births
Asian Wrestling Championships medalists
20th-century South Korean people
21st-century South Korean people